Algyő  is a large village in Csongrád County, in the Southern Great Plain region of southern Hungary.

Geography

References

External links

  in Hungarian, English, German and Serbian
Aerialphotgraphs of Algyő

Populated places in Csongrád-Csanád County